Woolrich is an American clothing company.

Woolrich may also refer to:

Woolrich (surname)
Woolrich, Pennsylvania, unincorporated community

See also
Woolwich (disambiguation)